Burwardsley is a village and civil parish the unitary authority of Cheshire West and Chester and the ceremonial county of Cheshire, England.  The parish also includes the small villages of Burwardsley, Burwardsley Hill, Higher Burwardsley.  The parish also includes Burwardsley Hall and is part of two Cheshire long-distance footpaths, the Sandstone Trail and the Eddisbury Way. The parish church of St John the Devine is in Burwardsley. The village has a post office and a pub, The Pheasant Inn, with views over the Cheshire plains to Wales and Merseyside. The primary school is now an outdoor education centre.

See also

Listed buildings in Burwardsley
St John's Church, Burwardsley

External links

Villages in Cheshire
Civil parishes in Cheshire